Trent Bryde (born 24 August 1999) is an American tennis player.

Early life
Bryde, the son of Bruce and Kathi Bryde, is from Atlanta, Georgia. He attended and played collegiate tennis at the University of Georgia where he majored in consumer economics.

Career
Bryde was very successful in his junior career. Achieving a high ranking of 8 in both the singles and the doubles and posting a win–loss record of 107–69 in the singles and 92–52 in the doubles.

Bryde was given a wildcard into the 2019 BB&T Atlanta Open qualifying draw but lost in the first round to Kamil Majchrzak. At the very next edition, he was given his ATP tour debut as a wildcard at the 2021 Atlanta Open where he was drawn against Brandon Nakashima in the first round. He lost to Nakashima in a hard-fought match 1–6, 7–6(7–5), 4–6.

References

1999 births
Living people
Tennis people from Georgia (U.S. state)
Tennis players from Atlanta
American male tennis players
Georgia Bulldogs tennis players
21st-century American people